Acquired hemolytic anemia can be divided into immune and non-immune mediated forms of hemolytic anemia.

Immune
Immune mediated hemolytic anaemia (direct Coombs test is positive)
 Autoimmune hemolytic anemia
 Warm antibody autoimmune hemolytic anemia
 Idiopathic
 Systemic lupus erythematosus (SLE)
 Evans' syndrome (antiplatelet antibodies and hemolytic antibodies)
 Cold antibody autoimmune hemolytic anemia
 Idiopathic cold hemagglutinin syndrome
 Infectious mononucleosis and mycoplasma (atypical) pneumonia
 Paroxysmal cold hemoglobinuria (rare)
 Alloimmune hemolytic anemia
 Hemolytic disease of the newborn (HDN)
 Rh disease (Rh D)
 ABO hemolytic disease of the newborn
 Anti-Kell hemolytic disease of the newborn
 Rhesus c hemolytic disease of the newborn
 Rhesus E hemolytic disease of the newborn
 Other blood group incompatibility (RhC, Rhe, Kidd, Duffy, MN, P and others)
 Alloimmune hemolytic blood transfusion reactions (i.e., from a non-compatible blood type)
 Drug induced immune mediated hemolytic anemia
 Penicillin (high dose)
 Methyldopa

Non-immune
Non-immune mediated hemolytic anemia (direct Coombs test is negative)
 Drugs (i.e., some drugs and other ingested substances lead to hemolysis by direct action on RBCs, e.g., ribavirin )
 Toxins (e.g., snake venom; plant poisons such as aesculin)
 Trauma
 Mechanical (from heart valves, extensive vascular surgery, microvascular disease, repeated mechanical vascular trauma)
 Microangiopathic hemolytic anemia (a specific subtype with causes such as TTP, HUS, DIC and HELLP syndrome)
 Infections (Note: Direct Coombs test is sometimes positive in hemolytic anemia due to infection)
 Malaria
 Babesiosis
 Sepsis
 Membrane disorders
 Paroxysmal nocturnal hemoglobinuria (rare acquired clonal disorder of red blood cell surface proteins)
 Liver disease

Drug induced hemolysis
Drug induced hemolysis has large clinical relevance. It occurs when drugs actively provoke red blood cell destruction. It can be divided in the following manner:
 Drug-induced autoimmune hemolytic anemia
 Drug-induced nonautoimmune hemolytic anemia

A total of four mechanisms are usually described, but there is some evidence that these mechanisms may overlap.

References

External links